Paso del Macho is a municipality in Veracruz, Mexico.

Geographic limits

The municipality of Paso del Macho is delimited to the north by Zentla to the east by Carrillo Puerto to the south by Cuitláhuac, to the west by Atoyac and to the north-west  by Tepatlaxco. The municipality is located in the central zone of the state; its soil presents some irregularities without importance.

Agriculture

It produces principally maize, beans, sugarcane, coffee and mango.

Celebrations

In November takes place the celebration in honor to San Martín, patron of the town, and on the 12th of December takes place the celebration in honor of the Virgen de Guadalupe .

Weather

The weather in Paso del Macho is warm and dry  all year with rains in summer and autumn.

References

External links 
  Municipal Official webpage
  Municipal Official Information

Municipalities of Veracruz